The Beggars of Burgos (Les mendiants de Burgos) is a painting by Gustave Doré, done in 1875. Painted using oil on canvas, it was sold in 2012 by Galerie Michel Descours. It is now in a private collection.

Description
The Beggars of Burgos shows a group of Castilian beggars clustered before a whitewashed wall as though they have assembled for a portrait. Most are dressed in tattered blankets, threadbare shawls, and disheveled clothing, though some wear colorful sashes and hats. A young mother, perhaps a recent widow, sits alone holding her infant. A crippled man lies in a small wooden wagon, his hands wrapped in leather or rags. Near the center, a tall man leans on walking sticks; one family with two small children stands to his left, while a couple sprawl on the sidewalk with an infant and a dog. Others beggars seen at the edges of the painting include a woman with a tambourine and several men who may have once been soldiers or tradesmen fallen on hard times.

References
This article contains public domain text from the CDC as cited.

1875 paintings
Works by Gustave Doré